The Banner of Labor was an order issued in the German Democratic Republic (GDR).

It was given for "excellent and long-standing service in strengthening and consolidating the GDR, especially for achieving outstanding results for the national economy".

The order was established on 4 August 1954 in one class. On 8 August 1974 it was divided into three classes. The 1st Class was the highest class and each class included a cash award:

1st Class: 1,000 East German marks, limited to 250 per year
2nd Class: 750 East German marks, limited to 500 per year
3rd Class: 500 East German marks, limited to 1,000 per year

For collectives with up to 20 members, there were cash awards of 2,000, 3,500 and 5,000 Marks per member. 

The Banner of Labor was awarded to:

 Individuals and collectives in all three classes
 Enterprises, Collective organizations, institutions and cooperatives in the 1st Class

A prerequisite was that individuals and members of collectives already had received other state awards. The Order could be given in any class several times, even to citizens of other countries.

The awards ceremony took place each year on 1 May until 1989 and this order was presented by the Chairman of the State Council or on his behalf. A certificate was presented with the Order.

The medal is gilded, with dimensions of 44 x 37 mm. It is worn on the left chest. Establishments were entitled to include a symbol of the Order on their flag as well as on documents.

Recipients
1955: Luise Ermisch
1959: Walter Arnold (Germany) 
1960: Hermann Axen, Friedrich Burmeister, Georg Ulrich Handke, Willi Bredel, Werner Bruschke 
1962: Kurt Hager 
1963: Erich Hans Apel, Ernst Albert Altenkirch, Walter Halbritter, Paul Fröhlich, Günter Mittag, Hermann Pöschel 
1964: Rudi Georgi, Willi Stoph, Günther Wyschofsky 
1965: Peter Florin, Grete Groh-Kummerlöw, Ernst Scholz, Erich Engel 
1967: Rudi Georgi 
1968: Wilhelm Adam, Roman Chwalek, Horst Dohlus, Werner Lamberz 
1969: Lilly Becher, Klaus Gysi, Walter Halbritter, Ernst-Joachim Gießmann, Helmut Kirchberg, Paul Markowski, Hermann Pöschel, Kurt Wünsche
1970: Horst Dohlus 
1974: Manfred Feist, Wolfgang Gress
1976: Bruno Lietz, Eberhard Heinrich 
1978: Manfred Bochmann
1979: Hubert Egemann
1981: Gisela Glende 
1984: Bruno Lietz, Siegfried Lorenz, Erik Neutsch
1986: Egon Krenz
1988: Hartmut Buschbacher

References

See also
Orders, decorations, and medals of East Germany

Orders, decorations, and medals of East Germany
Awards established in 1954
Awards disestablished in 1989
1954 establishments in East Germany
1989 disestablishments in East Germany